Camp Station was located on Willow Street in Yarmouth, Massachusetts on Cape Cod. It was used during the summer months as a stop for the nearby Methodist summer camp.

External links

Yarmouth, Massachusetts
Old Colony Railroad Stations on Cape Cod
Stations along Old Colony Railroad lines
Former railway stations in Massachusetts